The Social Democratic Workers' Party of Germany (SDAP) was a Marxist socialist political party in the North German Confederation during unification.

Founded in Eisenach in 1869, the SDAP endured through the early years of the German Empire. Often termed the Eisenachers, the SDAP was one of the first political organizations established among the nascent German labor unions of the 19th century. It officially existed under the name SDAP for only six years (1869–1875). However, through name changes and political partnerships, its lineage can be traced to the present-day Social Democratic Party of Germany (SPD).

Origins

VDAV and ADAV 
The SDAP was one of the earliest organizations to arise from German workers' unionizing activity, but it was not the first. At the group's founding in 1869, the fast-growing working class of the Industrial Revolution had already established several notable associations for workers' advocacy. Chief among these were Leopold Sonnemann's Assembly of German Worker Associations (Verband Deutscher Arbeitervereine, VDAV) and Ferdinand Lassalle's General German Workers' Association (Allgemeiner Deutscher Arbeiterverein, ADAV).

The largest group by far was the VDAV. Through the 1860s, it remained mostly apolitical, dedicated to pocketbook matters and fully integrated with the paradigms of liberal economic interests. The VDAV did its best to ignore the political agitation of Lassalle's much smaller yet more active ADAV. The Lassalleans were seen as insufficiently committed to basic economic matters. Much of their political appeal was based on what socialists considered to be an alarming militancy in support of German nationalism and the question of Greater Germany. They displayed a discomfiting closeness to the militaristic Kingdom of Prussia. Eventually, the sundry turmoil created by the German unification wars helped politicize large elements of the previously unmoved VDAV. Some followed Sonnemann to the new moderately socialist German People's Party (founded in 1868), while others were ready to abandon the VDAV structure altogether and establish a more radical political party.

Eisenachers 
Meeting in the city of Eisenach in Saxony, the VDAV activists founded the Social Democratic Workers' Party (SDAP) on 7–9 August 1869. The Eisenachers, as they came to be called, were under the leadership of Wilhelm Liebknecht and August Bebel.

The political theorist Karl Marx had a significant personal influence upon the newly formed party, being a friend and mentor to both Bebel and Liebknecht. Marx and Friedrich Engels steered the party toward more Marxian socialism and welcomed them (as far as German law would allow) into their International Workingmen's Association (IWA).

Platform and organization 
The SDAP was typically deemed Marxist by most observers, although this term was somewhat amorphous during Marx's lifetime. The party was described as such mainly because of its IWA membership and Liebknecht's close personal relationship with Marx.

The true nature of Eisenacher Marxism was closer to democratic socialism than the communist parties of later decades. The party platform called for a free people's state (freier Volkstaat), which could align private cooperatives with state organizations. The party primarily supported trade unionism as the utility by which workers could prosper in the context of capitalism.

Der Volksstaat 
The party press was a vital element of the SDAP's political strategy. The party's newspaper was first called Demokratisches Wochenblatt (Democratic Weekly Paper) and later Der Volksstaat (The People's State) and was edited by Liebknecht. The paper was published in Leipzig from 2 October 1869 to 23 September 1876. The party did not yet have its own printers, but Liebknecht was ambitious in his efforts to promote its publications on a wide scale as educational tools for workers. Although most issues of Der Volksstaat were primarily composed of incendiary writing about the German political situation, Liebknecht attempted as much as possible to include essays on political theory, transcripts of academic lectures, and even some popular fiction.

Congress at Gotha 
Despite their differences, the SDAP and Lassalle's ADAV shared a largely identical interpretation of socialism. The similarity was significant enough to mean that they were both routinely monitored and considered equally suspicious by the authorities. The two parties were vying for the same audience among the working class, and they were doing so simultaneously with several more moderate liberal organizations. The critical distinction among all the groups' positions was their level of commitment to the right to strike.

SAPD and SPD 
The competition between moderate and radical factions reached a boiling point when SDAP and Lassalle's ADAV finally merged to form a united front. In a convention at Gotha in 1875, the new fusion party was renamed the Socialist Workers' Party of Germany (German: Sozialistische Arbeiterpartei Deutschlands, SAPD). The resultant Gotha Program was a mixture of socialist and liberal capitalist ideas. Though it largely satisfied the conventioneers, the new policies were denounced by Marx himself in the scathing essay Critique of the Gotha Program (1875).

Despite its relatively moderate stance, the SAPD organization was deemed subversive and officially banned by the German Empire under the Anti-Socialist Laws of 1878. Under proscription, the party's members continued to organize successfully. After the ban was lifted in 1890, they rechristened themselves as the Social Democratic Party of Germany (Sozialdemokratische Partei Deutschlands, SPD) and surged at the polls. By the 1912 elections, the SPD (a direct descendant of the small SDAP) had become the largest party in Germany.

Legacy 
Though the SDAP dissolved after a brief lifespan of just six years, it was an essential catalyst in creating the first significant labor party in Germany. After World War II, members of the SPD in East Germany were compelled to join forces with the Communist Party to form the Socialist Unity Party. Throughout its 41-year rule, the party paid regular tribute to its Marxist progenitor. In West Germany, the SPD became one of the two major parties and continues to wield vast influence in the post-reunification era. It still traces its lineage back to the SDAP at Gotha and Eisenach.

See also 
 History of the Social Democratic Party of Germany

Notes 

  Sometimes translated as Social Democratic Labor Party of Germany. See Lindemann et al.
  Not to be confused with the Socialist Workers' Party of Germany (also SAPD) which existed from 1931 to 1945.

References

Bibliography

Further reading 
 
 

Political parties of the German Empire
Defunct socialist parties in Germany
Social democratic parties in Germany
Political parties established in 1869
1875 disestablishments in Germany
1869 establishments in Germany
Social Democratic Party of Germany
Political parties disestablished in 1875